Lucius Cornelius Merula (died 87 BC) was a politician and priest of the late Roman Republic.

Biography 

Lucius Cornelius Merula held the office of flamen Dialis (high priest of Jupiter), and wore the flamens cap at all times, unlike the other flamines who only wore it while performing sacrifices.

In 87 BC, during the civil war between the consuls Gnaeus Octavius and Cinna, he was appointed consul by the former in place of his rival, who had been driven from the city. He negotiated the return of Cinna and Marius from banishment, and abdicated his consulship. However, false charges were made against him during Marius's purges of his political enemies, and he committed suicide, opening his veins in the Temple of Jupiter Capitolinus and imploring the gods to avenge him on Cinna and his allies. He had first taken care to remove his flamen'''s cap, for it was considered a sin for a flamen to wear it at his death.

The position of Flamen Dialis was now vacant. Marius's fourteen-year-old nephew Julius Caesar was nominated to fill it in 86 BC by Marius and Cinna.  Scholars disagree but this nomination was annulled by Sulla subsequently. The position was not filled again until under Augustus, between 16 and 10 BC, dated by Cassius Dio to 11 BC, but Tacitus to 15 BC.

References

Appian, Civil Wars 1.65, 70, 75
Velleius Paterculus, Roman History 2.20, 22
Florus, Epitome of Roman History 2.9
Suetonius, Julius 1
Cassius Dio, Roman History'' 54.35

87 BC deaths
1st-century BC Roman consuls
1st-century BC clergy
Ancient Romans who committed suicide
Merula, Lucius
Flamines Dialis
Priests of the Roman Republic
Roman patricians
Year of birth unknown